Burleston is a village in Dorset, England.

Burleston is listed in the Domesday Book of 1086, having at that time a small population of nine households and the Abbey of Milton St. Peter.

References

External links

Villages in Dorset